Staubbach Falls ( (sing.), lit.: dust creek fall) is a waterfall in Switzerland, located just west of Lauterbrunnen in the Bernese Highlands. The waterfall drops  from a hanging valley that ends in overhanging cliffs above the Weisse Lütschine.

The stream, on reaching the verge of the rocky walls of the valley, forms a cascade so high that it is almost lost in spray before it reaches the level of the valley. After rain, and early in the season when fed by melting snow, Staubbach Falls is very striking. The force of the stream above the fall at such times is sufficient to carry the water clear of the precipice, and the whole mass descends in a condition of liquid dust, between spray and cloud, that sways to-and-fro with the gentlest breeze. In a dry summer, when the supply of water is much reduced, the effect is comparatively insignificant.

A visit by Johann Wolfgang von Goethe in 1779 provided the inspiration for his poem "Gesang der Geister über den Wassern".

The falls were featured on the 3-centime Swiss postage stamp of the 1930s.

See also 
Trümmelbach Falls, another notable waterfall in the Lauterbrunnen valley

References

Waterfalls of Switzerland
Aare basin